The North Jutlandic Island, Vendsyssel-Thy, or Jutland north of the Limfjord (Jylland nord for Limfjorden), is the northernmost part of Denmark and of Jutland. It is more common to refer to the three traditional districts Vendsyssel, Hanherred and Thy, however. The area has been intermittently a tied island, and during modern times was not surrounded by water until a storm in February 1825, which severed the region from the remainder of Jutland and caused a water connection between the North Sea and the western end of the Limfjord. Hence it is traditionally regarded as a part of Jutland rather than a separate island.

Geographically, it is the second largest island of Denmark after Zealand (excluding Greenland) with a population of 294,424 on 1 January 2020. 309,834 lived on the island in 1981.

Danes rarely refer to the area as a whole, but more often to the three constituent districts or to North Jutland (which also includes an area south of the Limfjord). The adjectives nordenfjords and søndenfjords are also commonly used, meaning north and south of the Fjord, respectively. The names can all be considered ad hoc creations, as a traditional name for the island is lacking.

The island has six fixed transport links to the mainland (four road bridges, one road tunnel and one rail bridge). There are also two car ferry connections.

History
The North Jutlandic Island was connected to the Jutland Peninsula by the narrow sand tombolo of Agger Tange between c. 1200 and 1825. The area became an island again due to a storm on 3 February 1825, when the North Sea broke through the Agger Tange in its far southwest, separating the area from mainland Jutland and creating the Agger Channel. The current separator is the Thyborøn Channel which was created slightly further south by a flood in 1862. The original Agger Channel filled up with sand in 1877.

The syssel was a medieval sub-division which is regarded as the oldest type of administrative unit in Denmark, existing since before the middle ages. The land of the North Jutlandic Island was divided into two of these, Thysyssel (including Hanherred) and Vendsyssel.

Geography

The North Jutlandic Island consists of these three traditional regions:

Vendsyssel, the largest part to the east and north,
Thy, the lesser part to the west,
Hanherrederne or Hanherred, the central isthmus connecting Vendsyssel and Thy.

Since 1 January 2007, when the Danish municipal reform became effective, these areas along with Himmerland and the islands of Mors and Læsø have constituted the North Jutland Region, being the smallest of Denmark's five regions by population. Ecclesiastically, the North Jutlandic Island is the main part of the Diocese of Aalborg.

In traditional terms, the westernmost part of the island, Thy, is considered part of Northern and Western Jutland simultaneously. The term North West Jutland refers to Thy, the island Mors, and the parts of mainland Jutland bordering the western Limfjord, such as the peninsula of Salling and around the towns of Struer and Lemvig.

Key facts
Area: 4,685 km²
Population: 294,424 (January 1, 2020)

See also
Vendsyssel
Hanherred
Thy (district)
Traditional districts of Denmark
List of islands of Denmark

References

External links

Islands of Denmark
North Jutland Region
1825 establishments in Denmark
Skagerrak